Madre de Deus (Mother of God; also called Mãe de Deus and Madre de Dios) was a Portuguese ocean-going Carrack, renowned for her capacious cargo and provisions for long voyages. She was returning from her second voyage East under Captain Fernão de Mendonça Furtado when she was captured by the English during the Battle of Flores in 1592 during the Anglo–Spanish War. Her subsequent capture stoked the English appetite for trade with the Far East, then a Portuguese monopoly.

Description
She had seven decks, thirty-two guns in addition to other arms, 600 to 700 crew members, a gilded superstructure and a hold filled with treasure.

Capture

In 1592, by virtue of the Iberian Union, the Anglo-Portuguese Treaty of 1373 was in abeyance, and as the Anglo–Spanish War was still ongoing, Portuguese shipping was a fair target for the Royal Navy.

On , (sources vary as to the date) a six-member English naval squadron fitted out by the Earl of Cumberland and Walter Raleigh set out to the Azores to intercept Spanish shipping from the New World when a Portuguese fleet came their way near Corvo Island. The Roebuck under John Burgh finally took her after a fierce day-long battle near Flores Island.

Among these riches were chests filled with jewels and pearls, gold and silver coins, ambergris, rolls of the highest-quality cloth, fine tapestries, 425 tons of pepper, 45 tons of cloves, 35 tons of cinnamon, 3 tons of mace, 3 tons of nutmeg, 2.5 tons of benjamin (a highly aromatic balsamic resin used for perfumes and medicines), 25 tons of cochineal and 15 tons of ebony.

There was also a document, printed at Macau in 1590, containing valuable information on the China and Japan trade; Hakluyt observes that it was "enclosed in a case of sweet Cedar wood, and lapped up almost an hundredfold in fine Calicut-cloth, as though it had been some incomparable jewel".

Aftermath
The carrack whilst anchored at Dartmouth was subject to theft by curious locals; it attracted all manner of traders, dealers, cutpurses, and thieves from miles around. By the time Walter Raleigh had restored order, a cargo estimated at half a million pounds (nearly half the size of England's treasury and perhaps the second-largest treasure ever after the Ransom of Atahualpa) had been reduced to £140,000.

See also
 The Armada Service
 List of longest wooden ships
 Santa Anna (1522 ship)
 São João Baptista (galleon)
 Djong (ship)
 Baochuan

Notes

References

Further reading
 
 

1592
16th-century ships
Age of Discovery ships
Age of Sail merchant ships of Portugal
Carracks
Elizabeth I
History of the Royal Navy
Maritime history of Portugal
Piracy in the Atlantic Ocean
Ships attacked and captured by pirates